Alan, Allen or Allan Scott may refer to:

People

Sportsmen
Alan Scott (footballer, born 1900) (1900–1982), Australian rules ruckman for St Kilda (1929–30)
Alan Scott (footballer, born 1907) (1907–1973), Australian rules player for St Kilda (1924–26)
Allan Scott (footballer) (1910–after 1934), English inside right
Alan Scott (rugby league) (1939–2018), Australian second-row forward
Allan Scott (hurdler) (born 1982), Scottish Olympian in 2008

Writers
Alan Scott (RAF officer) (1883–1922), British Army and Royal Air Force group captain and memoirist
Allan Scott (American screenwriter) (1906–1995), American scenarist of So Proudly We Hail!
Murray Allan Scott (1932–2020, birth name of Canadian journalist Allan Fotheringham
Alan B. Scott (born 1932), American ophthalmologist and scientific author
Alan Scott (blacksmith) (1936–2009), Australian maker of brick ovens and author of baking manual
Allen J. Scott (born 1938), English writer and professor of geography and public policy
Allan Scott (Scottish screenwriter) (born 1939), Scottish screenwriter and producer of Regeneration

Other people 
Allen D. Scott (1831–1897), American lawyer and politician from New York
Allan Scott (businessman) (1923–2008), Australian truck magnate
Alan James Scott (born 1934), British Governor of Cayman Islands, 1987–1992
Alan Scott (ophthalmologist) (1932 - 2021), American ophthalmologist

Fictional characters
Alan Scott, alter ego of DC Comics superhero Green Lantern

See also
Al Scott (disambiguation)
Scott Allen (disambiguation)
Scott Allan